() is a Danish town in the Region of Southern Denmark. It is the main town and the administrative seat of Sønderborg Municipality (Kommune). The town has a population of 27,766 (1 January 2022), in a municipality of 73,711. In recent times, Sønderborg is a center for trade, tourism, industry, and education in the region of Southern Denmark. The town is the headquarters for several industrial companies. Sønderburg joined the UNESCO Global Network of Learning Cities in 2016.

Overview 

The town of Sønderborg is home to Sønderborg Castle (Sønderborg Slot), the Royal Danish Army's Sergeant School (until 2013) and Sandbjerg Estate (Sandbjerg Gods). Sønderborg castle is in the centre of the town, and houses a museum focusing on the history and culture of the area.  The museum is open all year. Sandbjerg Estate, which had belonged for many years to the Dukes of Sønderborg, and then to the Reventlow family, was donated to Aarhus University in 1954. In addition, Sønderborg has a castle-like barracks built by the German military in 1906, placed centrally by Als Fjord, opposite Alsion (see picture below).

The old part of Sønderborg is on the island of Als, but some of its western suburbs have spread onto the mainland of Jutland into what had been the interior of the fort of Dybbøl.

History 
Prior to the Second Schleswig War of 1864, Sønderborg was situated in the Duchy of Schleswig, a Danish fief, so its history is properly included in the contentious history of Schleswig-Holstein. In the 1920 Schleswig Plebiscite that returned Northern Schleswig to Denmark, 43.8% of the city of Sønderborg's inhabitants voted for the cession to Denmark and 56.2% voted for remaining part of Germany.

Geography 

The town of Sønderborg lies on both sides of Alssund; the narrow strait between these two sides is called Als Strait (Alssund). Two road bridges connect the city across the strait: the  Als Strait Bridge (Alssundbro), built in 1978–1981; and the  King Christian X's Bridge (Kong Christian Xs Bro), built in 1925–1930.

Education

Higher education

Sønderborg hosts several institutions of higher education. the University of Southern Denmark, University College South, and Business Academy SouthWest. Due to the local economy, the University of Southern Denmark offers several types of degrees in engineering such as: mechatronics; electronics; innovation and business; as well as degrees in economics, languages and European studies.

Secondary education
The technical school EUC Syd has a campus in Sønderborg, and offers a variety of trades programs, as well as the HTX high school diploma and the International Baccalaureate Diploma program.

Economy 
Sønderborg is an economic hub in the region of Southern Denmark, with industries within electronics, manufacturing, food processing, Information Technology and telecommunications among others, with several companies headquartered in and around the town.

The high-tech industry includes the manufacturing and development of electronics, machines, industrial equipment, and software. Companies of major importance in the high-tech sector headquartered in the region include Danfoss who employs around 1000 people in Sønderborg, and 40,000 people globally. Linak, headquartered in Nordborg 25 km from Sønderborg, produces linear actuators for a variety of different applications, from agriculture to healthcare, and employs around 1,100 people in the region. Maersk container industries(MCI), a part of the Maersk group, manufactures refrigerated and refrigeration machines shipping containers, has its headquarters in Sønderborg.

The food processing and meat packing group, Danish Crown has a slaughterhouse located in the town of Blans, outside of Sønderborg. The slaughterhouse produces pork and meat products for consumption, and employs around 940 people. BHJ is a leading supplier of animal proteins for the international food and pet food industries, with headquarters in Gråsten, outside of Sønderborg and more than 900 employees worldwide.

In telecommunications, TDC A/S operates a callcenter employing roughly 370 employees. In August 2014, TDC planned to outsource around 700 full-time positions to American company Sitel, by 2015.

Skyways technics, an aircraft service and repair company is headquartered at Sønderborg Airport and has 150 employees in Sønderborg and Billund. Saab AB also has offices in the town, mainly focused on sales and engineering.

Transportation 

The city is served by Sønderborg Airport. The airline, Alsie Express provides flights directly to Copenhagen and seasonal flights to destinations such as Bornholm and Naples. The train station in Sønderborg, located next to Alsion, provides daily services to Fredericia and Copenhagen, as well as a direct service to Copenhagen Airport. Mols-linjen operates daily ferry services from Fynshav to Bøjden on the island of Funen , with roads connecting the town to Odense and further to Sjælland and Copenhagen.

Notable natives

The Arts 
 Christian August Lorentzen (1749 in Sønderborg – 1828) a Danish painter and instructor of Martinus Rørbye
 Herman Bang (1857 in Asserballe – 1912) an author, of the Modern Breakthrough
 Kamma Svensson (1908 in Sønderborg – 1998) a Danish illustrator, contributed to Politiken 
 K.R.H. Sonderborg (1923 in Sønderborg – 2008) a new media artist and musician.
 Johannes Carstensen (1924 in Sønderborg – 2010) a neo-impressionistic Odsherred painter
 Per Nielsen (born 1954 in Sønderborg) a popular Danish trumpet player
 Søren Solkær (born 1969 in Sønderborg) a Danish photographer
 Sune Rose Wagner (born 1973 in Sønderborg) a songwriter, guitarist and vocalist, playing in the rock group The Raveonettes

Public thinking & Public Service 
 Baron Otto Grote zu Schauen (1636/1637 in Sønderborg – 1693) an Hanoverian statesman
 Lars Frodesen (1889 in Sønderborg – 1921) a writer and philosopher, heavily inspired by Blaise Pascal
 Else Roesdahl (born 1942 in Sønderborg) an historian, educator and archaeologist
 Vibeke Vasbo (born 1944 in Tandslet) a writer and women's rights activist
 Ralf Pittelkow (born 1948 in Sønderborg) a commentator on both radio and TV 
 Tom Buk-Swienty (born 1966) an historian, journalist and author, raised in Sønderborg
 Lisbeth Bech Poulsen, (Danish Wiki) (born 1982 n Sønderborg) politician, member of the Danish folketing for Socialistisk Folkeparti

Science & Business 

 Westye Egeberg (1770 in Sønderborg – 1830) a Danish-Norwegian timber and lumber businessman
 Jakob Nielsen (1890 in Mjels – 1959) a mathematician, worked on automorphisms of surfaces
 Johannes Iversen (1904 in Sønderborg – 1972) a Danish palaeoecologist
 Peder Moos (1906 in Sønderborg – 1991) a Danish furniture designer and cabinetmaker
 Jørgen Mads Clausen (born 1948 in Elsmark) Chairman of the board of Danfoss
 Lothar Göttsche (born 1961 in Sønderborg) a German mathematician, works on algebraic geometry
 Niels Christiansen (born 1966 in Sønderborg) a Danish businessman, CEO of Lego
 Jens Martin Skibsted (born 1970 in Sønderborg) a Danish designer, entrepreneur and author
 Thorsten Mauritsen (born 1977 in Sønderborg) a Danish climate scientist

Sport 

 Ludvig Drescher (1881 in Sønderborg – 1917) an amateur football goalkeeper, team silver medallist at the 1908 Summer Olympics
 Verner Blaudzun (born 1946 in Sønderborg) a former cyclist, team bronze medalist at the 1976 Summer Olympics
 Palle Jensen (born 1953 in Sønderborg) former handball player, competed in the 1976 and 1980 Summer Olympics
 Michael Søgaard (born 1969 in Sønderborg) a Danish badminton player
 Anders Hansen (born 1970 in Sønderborg) a semi-retired Danish professional golfer.
 Lars Christiansen (born 1972 in Sønderborg) a former team handball player, played 338 games for the Denmark men's national handball team
 Simon Poulsen (born 1984 in Sønderborg) a footballer, 31 caps with the Denmark national football team
 Nicki Thiim (born 1989 in Sønderborg) a professional Danish race-car driver
 Sara Keçeci (born 1994 in Sønderborg) a Turkish-Danish female handball goalkeeper
 Daniel Bachmann Andersen (born in 1990 in Sønderborg) a Danish equestrian athlete

Other 
The formerly ruling family of Schleswig-Holstein-Sonderburg married into Kings and Queens

Panoramic view

Culture

Musical institutions 
Sønderborg is home to the South Jutland Symphony Orchestra Sønderjyllands Symfoniorkester.

Attractions 
Sønderborg Castle is today a museum about the history of Southern Denmark. The science park Universe (earlier known as Danfoss univers) is located just north of Sønderborg.

In literature 
In Chapter 4 of Erskine Childers’ 1903 novel The Riddle of the Sands, the protagonists, two English yachtsmen, visit Sonderburg, then under German rule: "Fascinating Sonderburg, with its broad-eaved houses of carved woodwork, each fresh with cleansing, yet reverend with age; its fair-haired Viking-like men and rosy, plain-faced women, with their bullet foreheads and large mouths; Sonderburg still Danish to the core under its Teuton veneer. Crossing the bridge I climbed the Dybbol – dotted with memorials of that heroic defence – and thence could see the wee form and gossamer rigging of our yacht on the silver ribbon of the Sound. (...) In the old quarter I bargained over eggs and bread with a dear old lady, pink as a debutante, who made a patriotic pretence of not understanding German."

References

External links 
 
 

 
Municipal seats of the Region of Southern Denmark
Municipal seats of Denmark
Cities and towns in the Region of Southern Denmark
Port cities and towns of the Baltic Sea
Sønderborg Municipality